Timber king may refer to:
Burhan Uray (1931–2018), Chinese-born Indonesian businessman
Dan Singh Bisht (1906–1964), Indian businessman
Friedrich Weyerhäuser (1834–1914), German-born American businessman